Oberea jordani is a species of beetle in the family Cerambycidae. It was described by Per Olof Christopher Aurivillius in 1923.

References

jordani
Beetles described in 1923